Cardinal Edition is an imprint of Pocket Books.

History

Pocket Books created the Cardinal editions imprint in 1951.

References

Book publishing company imprints